Time Tunnel is a career retrospective from the funk metal band Living Colour. It includes promotional videos and live concert footage from the late 1980s and early 1990s. It was released on the heels of their Grammy Award-winning Time's Up album. Tracks include cover versions of Bad Brains' classic "Sailin' On" and The Rolling Stones' "It's Only Rock 'n Roll." Living Colour opened for the Stones on the band's 1989 Steel Wheels tour, and backstage footage from the tour is included on the video.

Track listing
 Funny Vibe
 Fight the Fight
 Sailin' On
 It's Only Rock 'n Roll
 Cult of Personality
 Pride

Personnel
 Corey Glover - vocals
 Vernon Reid - guitar
 Muzz Skillings - bass
 Will Calhoun - drums

Living Colour video albums